This is a list of drama films of the 2010s.

2010
 127 Hours
 Black Bread
 Black Swan
 Certified Copy
 The Disappearance of Haruhi Suzumiya
 The Fighter
 For Colored Girls
 Harry Potter and the Deathly Hallows – Part 1
 How To Train Your Dragon
 Kandahar
 The King's Speech
 My Name Is Khan
 The Social Network
 Winter's Bone
 Yuriko's Aroma

2011
 50/50
 Albert Nobbs
 Answers to Nothing
 The Artist
 The Descendants
 Extremely Loud & Incredibly Close
 The Girl with the Dragon Tattoo
 Harry Potter and the Deathly Hallows – Part 2
 The Help
 Hugo
 I Melt with You
 The Ides of March
 The Iron Lady
 Margin Call
 Melancholia
 Moneyball
 My Week with Marilyn
 One Day
 Real Steel
 Shame
 The Strange Thing About the Johnsons
 Take Shelter
 Toomelah
 The Tree of Life
 War Horse
Warrior

2012
 All Apologies
 Anna Karenina
 Arbitrage
 Argo
 Beasts of the Southern Wild
 Chasing Mavericks
 Cloud Atlas
 Django Unchained
 End of Watch
 Flight
 Get the Gringo
 Good Deeds
 Hitchcock
 The Hunger Games
 The Impossible
 Jack Reacher
 Killing Them Softly
 The Kirishima Thing
 Life of Pi
 Lincoln
 The Lucky One
 Magic Mike
 The Master
 Moonrise Kingdom
 No
 The Odd Life of Timothy Green
 People Like Us
 The Perks of Being a Wallflower
 Promised Land
 Rock of Ages
 A Royal Affair
 The Seedlings
 The Sessions
 Silver Linings Playbook
 Smashed
 Sparkle
 Sue, Mai & Sawa: Righting the Girl Ship
 Trouble with the Curve
 The Unspeakable Act
 Won't Back Down
 The Words

2013
 42
 At Any Price
 Avenged
 The Best Plan Is No Plan
 The Bling Ring
 Blue Jasmine
 Bozo
 El hijo de Hernández
 Endless Love
 Feed Me
 Fruitvale Station
 The Great Gatsby
 The House at the End of Time
 Locke
 Mud
 Now You See Me
 Nymphomaniac
 The Place Beyond the Pines
 Romeo & Juliet
 Temptation: Confessions of a Marriage Counselor
 These Final Hours
 Trance
 The Ultimate Task
 Veer!
 Walking with Dinosaurs
 White Rabbit
 The Wolf of Wall Street

2014
 The Atticus Institute
 The Babadook
 The Badger Game
 Bitter Love
 Body
 The Boundary
 Buzzard
 Cape Nostalgia
 Climbing to Spring
 Close Range Love
 The Corpse of Anna Fritz
 Dark Was the Night
 Digging Up the Marrow
 The Drop
 Echoes
 Forever Love
 Forever Young
 The Galaxy on Earth
 A Girl Walks Home Alone at Night
 God's Pocket
 Honeymoon
 Head Full of Honey
 House Keeping
 How to Train Your Dragon 2
 The Imitation Game
 The Intruders
 Late Phases
 Maps to the Stars  
 The Mirror
 Monsters: Dark Continent
 My Man
 Pale Moon
 Perfect Beyond
 Pride
 The Quiet Hour
 (Sex) Appeal
 Sorry, I Love You
 Tokyo Tribe
 The Two Faces of January (film)
 The Vancouver Asahi
 The Vatican Tapes
 Where the Devil Hides
Whiplash
 Who Is Undercover
 Who Moved My Dream
 Wonderful World End
 Z Nation

2015
 10 Days in a Madhouse
 12 Citizens
 Anomalisa
 April Fools
 Attack on Titan
 Bare
 The Big Short
 Biri Gal
 The Boy
 The Case of Hana & Alice
 C'est si bon
 Daughter of God
 Digging Up the Marrow
 Ex Machina
 Excess Flesh
 The Revenant
 Families
 Faults
 Hangman
 He Never Died
 The Hitch-Hiker
 The House on Pine Street
 Jogo de Damas
 Kakekomi
 Kaze ni Tatsu Lion
 Komban
 La La La at Rock Bottom
 The Lead Singer and Dancer and His Woman
 Lost in Wrestling
 Lost River
 Lotus Code
 Maestro!
 Moor
 Mountain Cry
 One & Two
 The Queens
 Reichsführer-SS
 San Andreas
 The Sisterhood of Night
 Spotlight
 Victor Frankenstein
 Voice from the Stone
 The Woman in Black: Angel of Death

2016
 Aozora Yell
 Rings
 Tenshi ni I'm Fine
 The Witch
 British Winters

2017
Bully
Logan
Love All You Have Left
Octav

2018

 Revolt (film) 
 Giving Up Forever

2019

 Bite The Apple 
 Bad Thoughts 
 Waves

References

Drama
2010s